Escape from Tarkov is a multiplayer tactical first-person shooter video game in development by Battlestate Games for Windows.  The game is set in the fictional Norvinsk region, where a war is taking place between two private military companies (United Security "USEC" and the Battle Encounter Assault Regiment "BEAR"). Players join matches called "raids" in which they fight other players and bots for loot and aim to survive and escape.

Gameplay 
The developers of Escape from Tarkov refer to the game as a realistic and hardcore first-person shooter, survival video game that borrows elements from massively multiplayer online games. In its current state, Escape from Tarkov incorporates three different modes for the players to play: online PMC raids, Scav (short for "scavenger") raids, and a temporary offline mode. In these raids, players can choose to play solo or in groups and spawn on one side of a variety of maps to choose from in the game. Once in-game, the players are given an extraction point on the other side of the map, and must fight against other players and non-player characters to reach that point in order to escape. In addition to these standard extractions, players are also given the opportunity to use "optional" extraction points near the middle of the map, but must meet various requirements per extract in order to do so, such as paying roubles (the primary in-game currency), not having a backpack, or having certain items equipped on their character. In addition to combat, players can also find loot in these maps such as firearms, equipment, and armor, and, once extracted, can store their loot in a stash to use in future raids or can be sold to other players in a virtual flea market if having a "found in raid" status.

When players die in a raid, they lose everything, including loot and the equipment they brought into the raid. Players can insure weapons and equipment they brought in which enables that gear to be returned to them if not taken by other players. In scavenger raids (known as scav runs) players are given a random set of equipment, instead of items from their personal stash, and enter a raid that is already in progress at a random location. After finishing a scavenger raid, there is a cooldown timer until the mode becomes available again for the player. Each raid lasts between 15 and 45 minutes depending on the map, and may contain up to 14 players.

While not in a raid, players can sell unwanted loot to traders or other players via the flea market and purchase new equipment. These traders also task the player with completing quests which increase their trader loyalty, enabling access to more items and quests. Players have an upgradeable "Hideout" living area, which is an underground bomb shelter that – once upgraded with scavenged or purchased materials – gives the players in-game bonuses. These bonuses include reducing the cooldown timer to play as a Scav, increasing experience gained, and the ability to craft items.

Combat 
Escape from Tarkovs gameplay has been compared to military simulation games such as the ARMA series. Weapons can be built by the player by customizing all its constituent parts, such as selecting the dust cover, grip, stock and scope, a degree of complexity uncommonly seen in the first-person shooter genre. They can equip their character with military equipment including armored vests, armored rigs, and ballistic helmets.

In-game, the player has fine-grained control over their character's movement speed and crouch height. To check how much ammunition is still in their weapon requires checking the magazine manually – no on-screen counter is provided. The game also has a health system, whereby each of the character's limbs has hit points. Taking damage requires specific types of medical supplies to address wounds, such as bandages for bleeding. The game models realistic ballistics, including features such as ricochets and bullet penetration.

Scavenging items from containers and bodies takes time, as each item is revealed individually while the player searches. The player must also monitor their energy and hydration levels over the course of a raid.

Synopsis

Setting 
Escape from Tarkov is set in the fictional city of Tarkov, the capital of the Norvinsk Special Economic Zone in Northwestern Russia between the years 2015 and 2026. Political scandals and collapse of corporations have resulted in the social breakdown of Tarkov and warring factions have turned the city into a shell of itself with sections of the city being under control of aggressive locals called "scavs". Streets of Tarkov as of March 2020 is a location under development and was planned to come out sometime in 2021. A free-roam option that would combine all the locations into one is also planned, providing open-world gameplay.

Factions 
There are two PMC factions for players to choose in the game: United Security (USEC), a Western-based company hired by a corporation known as TerraGroup to cover up the company's illegal activities, and BEAR, a company created by the Russian government to investigate these activities. Each faction has its own gameplay advantages as well as unique cosmetics. For example, USEC-based players are specialized in Western or NATO-based firearms, while BEAR-players specialize in Russian firearms.

The primary opposing, playable NPC faction is the Scavs, which are aggressive locals of Tarkov that are hostile to both BEAR and USEC. There are Normal Scavs (scavengers), Cultists, Scav Raiders, Rogues, and Scav Bosses. Normal Scavs have low tier gear and weapons, and are the primary AI opponent and playable on a cooldown timer. Cultists, Scav Raiders, and Bosses have better equipment than Normal Scavs, each having a different artificial intelligence behavior and each specializing in a specific location in Tarkov. The Rogues are a group of ex-USEC PMC operatives who have decided to band together to control the water treatment plant on the Lighthouse map. Scav Raiders are a group of ex-USECs and BEARs who banded together, they spawn on the maps Reserve and Labs when extractions are switched on. They can have high tier gear and modded weapons. Cultists have a chance to spawn on the maps Customs, Factory, Shoreline or Woods between 22:00 and 06:00 in game time. They can carry good gear and high-tier keys. Battlestate Games is known to change the spawn rates and maps on which these factions appear during events.

Development 
Escape from Tarkov began development in 2012. Battlestate Games lead developer Nikita Buyanov stated that he and the staff gained their experience through working at Absolutsoft on their previous work Contract Wars. Both Escape from Tarkov and Contract Wars are set in what the developers refer to as the Russia-2028 universe. Some development staff also have experience from real-world military experience, with one being a former Spetsnaz operator.

The developers recorded some weapon sounds by recording real weapons in abandoned warehouses.

Over the course of the game's beta period the developers have released regular game updates, including new features, maps, characters, and equipment. These updates sometimes come with a reset of players' in-game progression ("wipe").

The game has faced issues with cheaters and real money trading – the practice whereby players sell in-game currency for real-world money, violating the game's license agreement. In 2020 the developers cracked down on the practice of purchasing currency by trading expensive items with other players in-game, warning players to avoid "constant distribution of items in raids to other players". This caused confusion among players, as concerns were raised about the boundaries of legitimate item trading.

Release 
Battlestate Games have stated that Escape from Tarkov would be a traditional full purchase release without any free-to-play or microtransaction elements. There is a possibility of a release on Steam sometime after the game's official release in addition to downloadable content. The early-access version of the game is released in four editions (Standard, Left Behind, Prepare for Escape, and Edge of Darkness), with each increasing edition having more starting equipment and a larger stash for the player to use than the previous.

Escape from Tarkov was launched as a closed alpha game that was first made available to select users on 4 August 2016. Battlestate Games then announced that the game would go into its extended alpha stage on 28 December 2016, which would available to select users who preordered the game. This is the stage where Battlestate released the game in four preorder tiers, with the Edge of Darkness edition guaranteeing players access to the alpha build. All players who had access were subject to a non-disclosure agreement (NDA) and video coverage of the gameplay via streaming was limited to a few select players until 24 March 2017, when the NDA was lifted.

The game entered closed beta on 28 July 2017, being made available to all players no matter the pre-order edition they purchased. It received a substantial spike in popularity in early 2020 on Twitch, when a promotional event took place providing players with in-game items for watching streams. The increase in popularity led to server issues and long matching times. The game hit its peak concurrent player count of 200,000 in May 2020, following the release of a major update.

The developers have also published a live-action miniseries, titled Raid, first released on 29 March 2019 on YouTube. The first episode has been viewed more than five million times. The Raid video series ended with a total of five episodes with the latest being published on 25 February 2021.

Controversy 
	
Battlestate Games has been accused of abusing YouTube's DMCA system to remove negative videos of Escape from Tarkov. YouTube user Eroktic released a video accusing Battlestate Games of leaking user information, resulting in Battlestate Games issuing DMCAs on 47 YouTube videos posted by the user, two of which were removed for allegedly spreading false information and the rest for spreading "negative hype". While Battlestate Games initially stated that they had only used DMCA claims on one user, it was later revealed that another YouTuber had received claims – both reported losing viewership and income as a result. The Battlestate Games Twitch account was temporarily banned in December 2019 after an employee pointed an empty gun at his head and pulled the trigger while streaming on the website.  

In a 2016 interview, one of the game's developers stated that there would be no women or playable female characters in the game because "women can't handle that amount of stress. There's only place for hardened men in this place." After apologising for the previous comments, Battlestate Games clarified their position in 2020, stating that while the employee's comments did not reflect the company's position or opinion as a whole, there would be no playable female characters due to "game lore and more importantly, the huge amount of work needed with animations, gear fitting, etc." Battlestate Games also stated that the employee would be reprimanded for his comments.

Reception 
In a 2018 preview of the closed beta, Heather Alexandra commented, "Tarkov is punishing, but there's a lot of fun to be found in mastering its complexities and slowly becoming a hardened mercenary." In PC Gamer, Steven Messner described the game as unearthing "a new vein of potential for online shooters", and commented positively on the way the game's systems lead players to value their equipment and recall stories about how they were acquired.

References

External links 
 
 

First-person shooter multiplayer online games
Tactical shooter video games
Upcoming video games
Video games developed in Russia
Video games set in Russia
Windows games
Windows-only games